Hadrodelphis is an extinct genus of dolphin once assigned to the paraphyletic/polyphyletic family Kentriodontidae. Remains have been found in the middle Miocene (Langhian) Calvert Formation of United States.

Taxonomy
Harodelphis is similar to Macrokentriodon in its larger size and its large tooth diameter. Despite being traditionally assigned to Kentriodontidae, recent cladistic analyses have recovered it along with Macrokentriodon in a clade with Kampholophos as sister to crown Delphinida and more derived than Kentriodon and Rudicetus.

Hadrodelphis poseidon was described from two isolated teeth from Miocene deposits in west-central France in 1971, but its validity was questioned by Dawson (1996).

References

Prehistoric toothed whales
Miocene cetaceans
Fossil taxa described in 1996